Shashi Airport , was an airport in Shashi, in Hubei province of central China. The airport closed on May 7, 2002.

See also
List of airports in China

References

Airports in Hubei
Defunct airports in China